The Norwegian Nuclear Energy Safety Authority is a defunct Norwegian government agency that was responsible for inspection of nuclear affairs in the country.

It was established in 1973. In 1993 it was merged with the National Institute of Radiation Hygiene to form the Norwegian Radiation Protection Authority.

References

Defunct government agencies of Norway
Government agencies established in 1973
Government agencies established in 1993
Nuclear power in Norway
Radiation protection organizations